Koh Kae is a snack food brand from Thailand manufactured by Mae-Ruay Snack Food Factory Company, Ltd. The brand is applied to a range of snacks made with legumes, peas and beans. Its most popular variety is the Japanese-style peanuts.

External links
 Koh-Kae 

Thai brands
Thai cuisine
Brand name snack foods